Farhanna Farid is a Singaporean powerlifter. She is a 2-time Asian champion and a 4-time national champion. As of 2022, she has broken 6 Asian records and a world record and is also the first Singaporean to win an overall gold medal in an international competition for the female's open category. She made her international competition debut in the 2018 Asian Classic Powerlifting Championships winning three golds.

Biography 
Farhanna was born in Singapore in 1992. She graduated from the National University of Singapore (NUS), and works professionally as a pharmacist. She started her Powerlifting career in 2017, entering her first international competition in 2018.

Career 

Farhanna started competing in 2018 in Powerlifting Singapore's national competition, the Singapore Powerlifting Open and won her category, breaking 4 national records. She went on to compete in three more national competitions and is now the 4-time national champion.

Making her international career debut, Farhanna competed in the under 52kg open Category at the 2018 Asian Classic Powerlifting Championships in Ulaanbaatar, Mongolia. She broke the Asian record in her first deadlift attempt, and exceeded her first lift in both her second and third attempt. Her 173 kg deadlift exceeded the previous Asian record by 13 kg.

She was awarded the Best Lifter (silver) by IPF Points and also won the Squat (120 kg) and Overall categories in her weight class, in addition to a bronze in the Bench Press. Farhanna competed in the 2019 Asian Classic Championships held in Almaty, Kazakhstan. In this competition, she retained her Asian champion title to become the 2-time Asian champion.

She ended off the competition with a silver medal in the Squat (127.5 kg), and a bronze medal in the Bench Press (57.5 kg) as well as breaking the Asian record in her second deadlift attempt and won two gold medals in the Deadlift (178 kg) and Overall category (363 kg). Both her Deadlift and Total were new Asian records.

World record 
On 6 June 2022, Farid set a world record in the open U-52kg deadlift at the World Open Classic Powerlifting Championships 2022 in Sun City, South Africa. She achieved 200.5kg, ahead of France's Noemie Allabert and Shizuka Rico who achieved 192.5kg and 185kg respectively.

On 16 September 2022, Farid broke her world record, lifting 201kg at the inaugural Southeast Asian Cup in Johor Bahru, Malaysia.

References 

1992 births
Singaporean powerlifters
Female powerlifters
Living people